USS Patchogue has been the name of more than one United States Navy ship, and may refer to:

 , a ferryboat in service from 1917 to 1922
 , a submarine chaser in commission from 1942 to 1950, renamed USS Patchogue (PC-586) in 1955 while out of commission

United States Navy ship names